Cymindis triangularis is a species of ground beetle in the subfamily Harpalinae. It was described by Reitter in 1897.

References

triangularis
Beetles described in 1897